Cedric Clarke is a retired British Labour politician. He was the first black Leeds City Councillor, serving from 1980 to 1990 and was made an Honorary Alderman of Leeds in 2016

Personal life 
Prior to his election as a councillor, Clarke worked as a plasterer and lived in Chapeltown with his wife and three children. Active in the local community, Clarke volunteered with probation services and was a trainee preacher at Roscoe Methodist Church. He established the United Caribbean Association, along with the founder of Leeds West Indian Carnival, Arthur France.

Career 
Clarke was elected to represent the Chapel Allerton ward in 1980, becoming the first African-Caribbean councillor in Leeds. He was involved with a number of council initiatives, for example chairing the Equal Opportunities Committee for Leeds City Council. Within three years of being elected, Clarke and his fellow-councillors introduced 220 new houses to the area, consistent street-cleaning, homes for the elderly, new nursery units and support for small businesses. Despite these achievements he lost his seat on Leeds City Council in 1990.

Honours 
In 2016 Clarke was appointed an Honorary Alderman of Leeds in recognition of his work in the city.

See also 
 Alison Lowe
 Leeds West Indian Carnival

References 

Living people
Year of birth unknown
Councillors in Leeds
Labour Party (UK) councillors
Black British politicians
Year of birth missing (living people)